Topping is an unincorporated community in Middlesex County, Virginia, United States. Topping has a post office with ZIP code 23169.

Topping is home to Hummel Field, an airfield created by Fred Hummel, a member of the Early Birds of Aviation, in 1925. Hummel then donated the site to Middlesex County in 1970.

Prospect was listed on the National Register of Historic Places in 2004.

References

Unincorporated communities in Middlesex County, Virginia
Unincorporated communities in Virginia